African theology is Christian theology from the perspective of the African cultural context. It should be distinguished from black theology, which originated from the American and South African context and is more closely aligned with liberation theology. Although there are ancient Christian traditions on the African continent, during the modern period Christianity in Africa was significantly influenced by western forms of Christianity brought about by European colonization.

Terminology 
Black theology and African theology emerged in different social contexts with different aims. Black theology developed in the United States and South Africa, where the main concern was opposition to racism and liberation from apartheid, while African theology developed in the wider continent where the main concern was indigenization of the Christian message.

Development 
In the mid-20th century, African theology as a theological field came into being. This movement began to protest against negative colonial and missionary interpretations of the religion and culture in Africa. Realizing that theology is a contextual phenomenon, African Christians began to read the Bible using their own cultural lens, which of course resulted in some interpretations that did not always agree with how Western theology interpreted things. As such, African theology stands on the shoulders of the early African independent churches that broke away from missionary churches in the late 19th century or early 20th century. African theology is engaged to shape Christianity in an African way by adapting and using African concepts and ideas.

African theologians such as Charles Nyamiti, Bolaji Idowu, John Mbiti, and Kwesi Dickson have given an analysis and interpretation of the African traditional religion and point to its relation to the Christian faith. Lamin Sanneh and Kwame Bediako have argued for the importance of vernacularization of the Bible and theology. Kwame Bediako and John Pobee have developed an African Christology in terms of the ancestors.

There is also a movement of African female theologians, organized in Circle of Concerned African Women Theologians, inaugurated in 1989 by the Ghanaian Mercy Amba Oduyoye. Nowadays this is a movement of hundreds of women theologians from several African countries and with different religious backgrounds. The general coordinators of the circle have been Oduyoye, Musimbi Kanyoro, Isabel Apawo Phiri, Malawian Fulata Moyo, and currently Musa Dube.

African theology's leveraging of traditional culture and religion is concerning for some conservative Christians. Evangelicals such as Byang Kato have argued that such engagement results in religious syncretism. African Pentecostals have also seen traditional culture as custodians to idolatry and the occult. However, recent evangelicals have begun to wrestle with the quest of developing a Christian theology which has African context in mind. In this direction, African evangelicals have taken initiative to develop an African biblical commentary. Even though this is not a critical commentary, it shows a quest by African evangelicals to engage traditional and contemporary issues in Africa from an evangelical perspective. Secondly, African evangelicals have also taken initiative in the development of Christian ethics and texts on systematic theology which engage the various issues facing most African Christians. For example, Samuel Kunhiyop has engaged Christian ethics and systematic theology from an African evangelical perspective. Similarly, Matthew Michael has engaged systematic theology from the vantage point of African traditions.

Furthermore, the focus on tradition has been seen to restrict African theology. It does not allow theology to respond to the changing nature of culture, especially in light of the growing usage of digital technology.

See also 

 Black theology
 Christianity in Africa
 Womanist theology

References

Footnotes

Bibliography

Further reading 

 
 
 
 

Christianity in Africa
Christian theological movements
World Christianity